Barbaresco is a comune (municipality) in the Province of Cuneo in the Italian region Piedmont, located about  southeast of Turin and about  northeast of Cuneo.
The commune is principally known for its homonymous medieval tower, constructed between the 12th and 14th centuries, and its production of wine bearing the same name.

Barbaresco borders the following municipalities: Alba, Castagnito, Guarene, Neive, and Treiso.

Demographic evolution

References

External links 
 www.comune.barbaresco.cn.it/

Cities and towns in Piedmont